Autoroute 440 (or A-440, also known as Autoroute Jean-Noël-Lavoie and previously as Autoroute Laval) is a provincial highway that runs across the city of Laval, Quebec from Autoroute 13 to Autoroute 25. It links every highway or expressway that connects Montreal to the North Shore.

Originally, it was supposed to have continued west in the Avenue des Bois corridor and crossed Rivière des Prairies on Bigras and Bizard Islands. On the latter island, the right-of-way is actually a public park. On the Island of Montreal, the A-440 right-of-way is just west of Boulevard Chateau-Pierrefonds. The autoroute would have ended at the Chemin Sainte-Marie interchange (Exit 49), on Autoroute 40.

History
A-440 was built over the following timeline:

Note: Only service roads were originally built from A-13 to Boulevard Industriel (Exit 24), but they were signed as Autoroute 440 until the autoroute was completed in 1994.

Exit list
The entire route is in Laval. The exit numbers do not correspond with the km marker because the highway is never fully completed.

References

External links 

Transport Quebec website
Transport Quebec Map 
A-440 at motorways-exits.com
A-440 at Quebec Autoroutes
Steve Anderson's MontrealRoads.com: Laval Autoroute (A-440)

40-4 Laval
Roads in Laval, Quebec